The 1998 Tennessee gubernatorial election took place on November 3, 1998. Incumbent Republican Don Sundquist ran for re-election to a second term as Governor of Tennessee, defeating Democratic candidate John Jay Hooker.

General election

References

Tennessee
Gubernatorial
1998